Green Movement, until 2019 The Greens, is a green-liberal political party in Bulgaria founded in 2008.

History
Green Movement emerged from a number of non-governmental organizations who felt, after years of work in the area of environment protection, human rights, etc. that their work needed serious political backing if it was to have a lasting effect. A major motivation to found a political party was criticism of various shortcomings in the political system in Bulgaria, including widespread corruption, lack of democratic control, and the general malfunction of state institutions at all levels. The party had its inaugural meeting in May 2008 in Sofia (capital of Bulgaria). During the following three months, more than 6000 members were registered. According to its statutes, the party has two chairpersons with equal rights.

In 2019, shortly before the European elections, the party was forced to change its name from "The Greens" to "Green Movement" because of a decision by Bulgaria's Supreme Court of Cassation which stated that another party had a right to the name. The leadership of Green Movement commented for the media: "Unfortunately, the pressure on us comes literally on the eve of the upcoming elections to the European Parliament, and at a time when the Greens, as part of the  Democratic Bulgaria coalition, we have all chances to become a real political factor opposing the corrupt and populist status quo".

Chairpersons 
As first chairpersons were elected Denica Petrova, Andrey Kovachev and Petko Kovachev (2008). A national assembly of the party in May 2010 consisting of about 50 delegates elected a new board of chairpersons with Georg Tuparev, Daniela Bozhinova and Andrey Kovachev.

Program
Green Movement see themselves as part of the network of green parties in Europe. 
The political program of the Greens reflects  a large extent the program of the European Green Party but also includes topics specific for Bulgaria such as changes in the political system in order to overcome inherent problems of governance and democratic control.

Elections
After an effective grassroots campaign, the Greens managed to secure registration for the June 2009 European Parliament elections, and received the official endorsement of the European Green Party. The party gained 0.72%. In the 2009 Bulgarian parliamentary election, the party gained 21,841 Votes, or 0.52%, which made it the ninth party of Bulgaria.

Statistics

Save Pirin Protests 

In 2018, the Greens supported the "Save Pirin" mass protests in Bulgaria against the expansion of the ski area in the Pirin National Park.

References

External links 
 
Official website of the Sofia (Sredec) local branch of Zelenite 
 - Party Program 
"Bulgarian Greens Established", The Sofia Echo, 18 May 2008.
Article in the Bulgarian news portal "aktualno" about the inaugural meeting of "Zelenite" (Bulgarian Greens) on 18 May 2008. 
Article in "news.bg" about an initiative of "Zelenite" to stop construction activities in Sofia (15 March 2008) 
Interview with Petko Kovachev, chairperson of "Zelenite", 4 June 2008, ipsnews.
Results of the parliamentary elections in June 2009 as published on the party's website 
How the established parties try to get rid of their competitors for the European elections. The article (2009) analyzes the bureaucratic obstacles the Greens and other small parties in Bulgaria were facing during two election campaigns in 2009.

Green parties in Europe
European Green Party
Centrist parties in Bulgaria
Global Greens member parties
Green liberalism